Ossiander is a surname. Notable people with the surname include:

 Andrés Lewin-Richter Ossiander (born 1937), Spanish composer of electronic music
  (1899–1984), Swedish actor
 Mina Ossiander, American mathematician